Katt may refer to:

People 
 Given name or nickname
 Big Katt (born 1977), American football player
 Katt Shea (born 1955), American actress
 Katt Williams (born 1971), American rapper and actor

 Surname
 George Katt (born 1975), American actor
 Geraldine Katt (1920–1995), Austrian actress
 Latika Katt (born 1948), Indian sculptor
 Nicky Katt (born 1970), American actor
 Ray Katt (1927–1999), American baseball player and coach
 Stephan Katt (born 1979), German racing driver
 William Katt (born 1951), American actor
 William Herman Katt (1915–1992), American actor

Other uses 
 Katt (Breath of Fire), a character in the video game Breath of Fire II
 Katt, a village in Shaheed Bhagat Singh Nagar district of Punjab State, India
 KATT-FM, a radio station in Oklahoma City